The women's 10,000 metres event featured at the 1997 World Championships in Athens, Greece. There were a total number of 34 participating athletes, with two qualifying heats on 2 August and the final being held on 5 August 1997.

Results

Heats
First 8 of each Heat (Q) and the next 4 fastest (q) qualified for the Final.

Final

See also
 1995 Women's World Championships 10.000 metres
 1996 Women's Olympic 10.000 metres
 1999 Women's World Championships 10.000 metres

References
 Results
 IAAF

 
10,000 metres at the World Athletics Championships
1997 in women's athletics